ADP-ribosylation factor-like 15 is a protein in humans that is encoded by the ARL15 gene.

References

Further reading 

Genes on human chromosome 5